Henry A. McMasters (1848 – November 11, 1872) was a United States Army Corporal during the Indian Wars who received the Medal of Honor on November 19, 1872, for service at Red River, Texas on September 29, 1872 in combat with the Kotsoteka band of the Comanche.

Medal of Honor citation
Citation:
Gallantry in action.

See also

List of Medal of Honor recipients

References

1848 births
1872 deaths
People from Augusta, Maine
American military personnel of the Indian Wars
United States Army soldiers
United States Army Medal of Honor recipients
American Indian Wars recipients of the Medal of Honor